Lodderena is a genus of minute sea snails or micromolluscs, marine gastropod molluscs in the family Skeneidae.

Species
Species within the genus Lodderena include:
 Lodderena bunnelli Redfern & Rolán, 2005
 Lodderena emeryi (Ladd, 1966)
 Lodderena formosa Powell, 1930
 Lodderena janetmayae Rubio, F., E.M. Rolán & C. Redfern, 1998
 Lodderena minima (Tenison-Woods, J.E., 1878)	
 Lodderena nana Powell, 1930
 Subspecies Lodderena nana pooki Fleming, 1948
 Lodderena omanensis Moolenbeek, 1996
 Lodderena ornata (Olsson & McGinty, 1958)
 Lodderena pachynepion (Pilsbry & Olsson, 1945)
 Lodderena pulchella (Olsson & McGinty, 1958)
 Lodderena tanae Moolenbeek, 1996
 Lodderena vladimiri Chernyshev, Rolán & Rubio, 2016
Species brought into synonymy
 Lodderena catenoides (Monterosato, 1877): synonym of  Skenea catenoides (Monterosato, 1877)

References

 Powell A. W. B., New Zealand Mollusca, William Collins Publishers Ltd, Auckland, New Zealand 1979 
 GBIF
 ZipCodeZoo
 Rolán E., 2005. Malacological Fauna From The Cape Verde Archipelago. Part 1, Polyplacophora and Gastropoda.

 
Skeneidae
Extant Miocene first appearances
Gastropod genera